Marcela Lobo Crenier (born September 12, 1959), is a Mexican artist from Mexico City whose work is distinguished by the depiction of everyday objects in strong, bright colors, often using color schemes associated with Mexico. She began her career in 1986 in Cancun doing etching, but moved to Mexico City and into painting by 1991. Most of her work is acrylics on canvas but she is also noted for her work with painting ceramics with Uriarte Talavera. She has also done painting on wood, created ceramics, collages and even shoe decoration and has been exhibited both individually and collectively in Mexico, Europe and the United States.

Life
Marcela Lobo Crenier was born on September 12, 1959 in Mexico City. Her father is an architect and her mother is a chef whose family has French heritage. She became involved and making craft at the very young age, remembering her childhood filled with cut paper, glue, scissors and more making objects of bright colors. She considers her talent to be a family inheritance, with a sister, Adriana, who is also a painter. Their shared interest in art bonds them rather than creates rivalry.

She studied art and design at the Universidad Motolina in Mexico City, then took classes in photography and drawing the human figure at the Centro Cultural Arte Contemporaneo  de México and studied painting at the workshop of Mercedes Escobar in Mexico City. Although she began her career in Cancun in etching, she continues to attend workshops and courses in various types of artistic expression such as ceramics and collage. However, she says that most of her training comes from the fact that she paints eight hours a day, every day, constantly learning through trial and error.

Career

She began her career in 1986 by doing etching work, starting her own business in Cancun. However, at the time there was no art scene and most of the area’s development had not yet taken off. She had no teachers or others to help her develop and she sometimes networked through friends and family elsewhere to get enough work to survive.

In 1991, she moved back to her hometown of Mexico City. She took classes in painting and began her habit of painting eight hours a day, which continues to this day. However, she also worked at an etching workshop with notable masters of the craft such as José Luis Cuevas, Manuel Felguérez and Carmen Parra. In addition to creating her own work she has worked on collaborative projects in places such as the Centro Cultural Arte Contemporáneo, the workshop of Mercedes Escobar in Mexico City and the Alfartía Traditional workshop of Gorky González of Guanajuato. One notable collaborative relationship is with Uriarte Talavera, with her most recent work with them as a participant in the El Cinco de Mayo de 1862 exhibition, honoring the 150th anniversary of the Battle of Puebla.

Lobo has had numerous collective exhibitions and a number of individual ones, consisting of collections of paintings, especially acrylics on canvas but also paintings on wood, collages, ceramic pieces and even decorating shoes. Her first individual exhibit was at the Club Porto Bravo in Valle de Bravo in 1991 and since then has primarily shown her work in Mexico, Europe and the United States. Showings in Mexico include the Orbe Galerías de Arte in Cancun (1993 and 1997), Naturalezas Viva at the Casa de Diálogo of the Teatro de México (1995), II Biennial Internacional de Arte Contemporáneo  in Mexico City (1998) El Color de México at the Secretaría de Desarrollo Social and  the Galería Kin in Mexico City (1999), De Mil Colores at the gallery of the Mexico City airport (2001), 18 a Todo Color at Televisa Guadalajara (2003), El Color de lo Cotidiano at the Museo Dolores Olmedo (2003), Una Fiesta para los Sentidos at the Galería de Arte de Oaxaca (2004), Allá Lejos y Tiempo Atrás at Casa Lamm Mexico City (2006) International shows include la Coleur du Mexique at the Mexican embassy in Paris (1997), A Côr do México at the Palace of Independence in Lisbon (1998), La Antigua art Gallery in Antigua Guatemala (2002) the Mexican consulate in Chicago and the Defoor Center in Atlanta, and the Jadite Gallery in New York (2011).

She has also participated in numerous collective exhibitions. These include a 1999 exhibition called Bodegones at Galería Kin with her sister Adriana Lobo. Other collective exhibitions include various early shows in Quintana Roo such as the IV Exposición de Artes Plásticas, the Feria del Arte of the Colegio Americano, at the Centro Cultural de Arte Contemporaneo in various years and the Arte de Nuevo Milenio show at the Florida Museum of Hispanic and Latin American Art in 2000.  An important individual showing was Significación at the Museo de Bellas Artes in Toluca in 2010, inaugurated by the then-governor of the state Enrique Peña Nieto. It includes images painted on columns, folding screens and wood, both painted and collage.

Her European showings have almost entirely been in France, with shows sold out in Paris and Lisbon, but her work has been sold to others on that continent and can be found in collections in various countries. She believes her colorful work is popular in Europe because it has a warmth which can be missing in cold climates.
Three catalogs of her work have been published, El color de lo cotidiano, from 2003 showing at the Dolores Olmedo Museum, Sitios, Espacio y Objetos in 2008 and Significaciones from her 2010 Toluca show.

In addition to her individual and collective shows, her career has included giving numerous classes in workshops such as thosededicated to engraving at the Ediciones Multiarte from 1989 to 1994, at Monumentos Conmemoratives from 1990 to 1992 and to the present at her own workshop. She has also worked as the personal secretary to a director of the Instituto Nacional de Bellas Artes and currently works as a special events coordinator for Museo Nacional de Arte.

Artistry

Her professional art production began with etchings while still in Cancun, moving into her primary mode of painting in 1991 after moving to Mexico City. However, her work still includes etching and has expanded to include ceramics, photography, interior design, drawing the human figure, painting Talavera and serigraphy. Her preference is to work with acrylics as they allow her to trace outlines easily, dry rapidly, are odorless and do not pollute. She does not make preliminary sketches before painting, with the only preliminary work being the tracing of lines on the canvas to assure balance in the composition.

Her work mostly focuses on painting still lifes and objects in general, as she states that she does not really like the human figure. Her focus is on ordinary objects which she sees mostly at people’s  houses, restaurants and other locations which her daily life takes her. She states that she prefers objects that people generally do not give a second thought to and give her enough in her memory to work eight hours a day. These objects include furniture, flower vases, fruit, flowers, bird cages, handcrafts, toys, toothbrushes, combs, perfume bottles, dishes and handbags. One example of painting from memory and experience was that after a trip to the Lacondon Jungle, tropical vegetation appeared in her work.

While the objects in her work are ordinary, her color scheme is distinguished by the used of bright strong colors, with an emphasis on those related to Mexico. She says she has been attracted to bright colors since she was a child and she prefers them now because of how they reflect light and the quality they give her images.  She cites as influences Matisse, Cézanne, Van Gogh and María Izquierdo. She states that much of her work is her interpretation of theirs.

She describes her work as costumbrista and even naïve, in the sense that the forms are simple and uncomplicated, but with a poetic view of the world. Her work has also been described as a homage to the country’s handcraft and folk art tradition . Her work has been praised by notable figures in Mexico such as Jacobo Zabludovsky, Andrés Henestrosa, Magda Carranza and Ricardo Legorreta .  Writer Jacobo Zabludovsky stated that her works are always cheerful, playing with color and light, never having lost her sense of childish wonder. She has stated that the purpose of her work is enjoyment, not to make anyone uncomfortable. One example of this was a small exhibit of her work at the cancer ward of the ABC Hospital in 2004, sponsored by a patient aid charity to bring color to that section of facility.

References

1959 births
Living people
Mexican artists
Mexican people of French descent
Artists from Mexico City